Willy Wonka & the Chocolate Factory is a 1971 American musical fantasy film directed by Mel Stuart and starring Gene Wilder as candymaker Willy Wonka. It is an adaptation of the 1964 novel Charlie and the Chocolate Factory by Roald Dahl. The film tells the story of a poor child named Charlie Bucket (Peter Ostrum) who, upon finding a Golden Ticket in a chocolate bar, wins the chance to visit Willy Wonka's chocolate factory along with four other children from around the world.

Filming took place in Munich from August to November 1970. Dahl was credited with writing the film's screenplay; however, David Seltzer was brought in to do an uncredited rewrite. Against Dahl's wishes, changes were made to the story and other decisions made by the director led Dahl to disown the film. The musical numbers were written by Leslie Bricusse and Anthony Newley while Walter Scharf arranged and conducted the orchestral score.

The film was released on June 30, 1971 by Paramount Pictures. With a budget of just $3 million, the film received generally positive reviews and earned $4 million by the end of its original run. In 1972, the film received an Academy Award nomination for Best Original Score, and Wilder was nominated for a Golden Globe as Best Actor in a Musical or Comedy. The film also introduced the song "The Candy Man", which went on to be recorded by Sammy Davis Jr. and become a popular hit. The film remained in obscurity until the 1980s when it gained a cult following and became highly popular for repeated television airings and home video sales. 

In 2014, the film was selected for preservation in the United States National Film Registry by the Library of Congress, as being "culturally, historically, or aesthetically significant".

Plot 

Charlie Bucket is a poor paperboy who often looks inside a candy shop but cannot afford to buy sweets. Going home one evening, he passes Willy Wonka's chocolate factory, where a tinker tells him that nobody ever goes in or comes out. Charlie's bedridden Grandpa Joe reveals that Wonka had shut down the factory because rival confectioners were sending in spies to steal his recipes; production resumed three years later, but the gates remained locked, and the original workers never returned to their jobs to prevent more sabotage, leaving their replacements a mystery.

Wonka announces that he has hidden five Golden Tickets in chocolate Wonka Bars. Finders of the tickets will receive a factory tour and a lifetime supply of chocolate. The first four tickets are found by a gluttonous German boy Augustus Gloop; the spoiled English girl Veruca Salt with a wealthy father; and from the United States, a constantly gum-chewing girl Violet Beauregarde, and the television-obsessed boy Mike Teevee. As each winner is announced on television, a sinister-looking man appears and whispers to them.

A news report reveals the fifth ticket was found by a millionaire in Paraguay, causing Charlie to lose hope. The next day, Charlie is on his way home from school when he finds money in a gutter and uses it to buy and eat candy; with the change, he buys a regular Wonka Bar for Grandpa Joe. Walking home, Charlie overhears that the millionaire forged the fifth ticket. Charlie opens his Wonka Bar, discovering the final ticket. Rushing back, he encounters the sinister figure who spoke to the other winners. Introducing himself as Slugworth, one of Wonka's competitors, he offers a reward for a sample of Wonka's latest creation: the Everlasting Gobstopper.

Returning home with the Golden Ticket, Charlie chooses Grandpa Joe as his chaperone, who excitedly jumps out of bed for the first time in twenty years. The next day, Wonka greets the ticket winners at the front gates of the factory and leads them inside, where each signs a contract before the tour. The factory includes the Chocolate Room, a whimsical indoor park with a river of chocolate and other sweets. The visitors meet Wonka's workforce: little people known as Oompa-Loompas.

During the tour, each child's character flaws cause them to give in to temptation, resulting in their unusual elimination: Augustus gets sucked up a pipe after falling into the chocolate river; Violet bloats into a giant human blueberry; Veruca falls down a garbage chute; and Mike is shrunk to the size of a chocolate bar. The Oompa Loompas sing a song of morality after each disposal. On the tour, Charlie and Joe enter the Fizzy Lifting Drinks room and sample the beverages against Wonka's orders. The drink makes them float up and have a near-fatal encounter with the ceiling exhaust fan, but burping allows them to escape and descend to the ground.

At the end of the tour, Wonka assures Charlie and Grandpa Joe that the other children will be fine before he hastily retreats to his office without awarding them the promised lifetime supply of chocolate. When they follow him in to ask about this, Wonka informs them that they had violated the contract when they stole the Fizzy Lifting Drinks, thereby forfeiting their prize. Ashamed of his actions, Charlie decides to return the Everlasting Gobstopper to Wonka instead of giving it to Slugworth. All of a sudden, Wonka joyously declares Charlie the winner, and reveals that Slugworth is actually his employee, Mr. Wilkinson. The offer to buy the Gobstopper was a morality test for the ticket winners, and only Charlie passed. The trio enters the Wonkavator, a multi-directional glass elevator, that flies out of the factory. During their flight, Wonka tells Charlie that he created the contest to find someone worthy enough to inherit his factory, so he will give it to Charlie and his family upon retiring.

Cast 

Oompa-Loompas
 Rudy Borgstaller
 George Claydon
 Malcolm Dixon
 Rusty Goffe
 Ismed Hassan
 Norman McGlen
 Angelo Muscat
 Pepe Poupee
 Marcus Powell
 Albert Wilkinson

Production

Development 
The idea for adapting the book into a film came about when director Mel Stuart's ten-year-old daughter read the book and asked her father to make a film out of it, with "Uncle Dave" (producer David L. Wolper, who was not related to the Stuarts) producing it. Stuart showed the book to Wolper, who happened to be in the midst of talks with the Quaker Oats Company regarding a vehicle to introduce a new candy bar from its Chicago-based Breaker Confections subsidiary (since renamed the Willy Wonka Candy Company and sold to Nestlé). Wolper persuaded the company, which had no previous experience in the film industry, to buy the rights to the book and finance the picture for the purpose of promoting a new Quaker Oats "Wonka Bar".

Wolper and Roald Dahl agreed that Dahl would also write the screenplay. Though credited for the film, Dahl had not delivered a completed screenplay at the start of production and only gave an outline pointing to sections of the book. Wolper called in David Seltzer for an uncredited rewrite after Dahl left for creative differences. Wolper promised to produce Seltzer's next film for his lack of a credit as they needed to maintain credibility by keeping Dahl's name attached to the production. Also uncredited were several short humorous scenes by screenwriter Robert Kaufman about the Golden Ticket hysteria. Changes to the story included Wonka's character given more emphasis over Charlie; Slugworth, originally a minor character who was a Wonka industry rival in the book, was reworked into a spy so that the film could have a villain for intrigue; a belching scene was added with Grandpa and Charlie having "fizzy lifting drinks"; and the ending dialogue.

Wolper decided with Stuart that the film would be a musical and approached composers Richard Rodgers and Henry Mancini, but both declined. Eventually, they secured the songwriting team Leslie Bricusse and Anthony Newley. Seltzer created a recurring theme that had Wonka quote from various literary sources, such as Arthur O'Shaughnessy's Ode, Oscar Wilde's The Importance of Being Earnest, Samuel Taylor Coleridge's The Rime of the Ancient Mariner and William Shakespeare's The Merchant of Venice.

There are different interpretations regarding the title change to Willy Wonka & the Chocolate Factory. In the United States during the 1960s, the term "Mister Charlie" had been used as a pejorative expression in the African-American community for a "white man in power" (historically plantation slave owners) and press reports claimed the change was due to "pressure from black groups". During the same period, US soldiers in the Vietnam War used the derisive term "Charlie" for the Viet Cong, originating from the acronym VC using the callsign "Victor Charlie". The studio publicity stated that the title "was changed to put emphasis on the eccentric central character of Willy Wonka". However, Wolper said he changed the title to make the product placement for the Wonka Bar have a closer association. Stuart confirmed the matter was brought to his attention by some African-American actors and he also claimed to have changed the title saying, "If people say, 'I saw Willy Wonka,' people would know what they were talking about. If they say, 'I saw Charlie,' it doesn’t mean anything".

The book was also in the midst of a controversy when the film was announced. Protest groups including the NAACP had taken issue with the original Oompa-Loompas depicted as African pygmies and compared them to slavery. Stuart addressed the concerns for the film and suggested making them the distinctive green-and-orange characters.

Gene Wilder wanted specific changes to Wonka's costume, including what type of trousers the character should wear, "the color and cut" of his jacket and the placement of pockets. Wilder's attention to detail also requested, "The hat is terrific, but making it 2 inches shorter would make it more special".

Casting 
Before Wilder was officially cast as Willy Wonka, producers considered Fred Astaire, Joel Grey, Ron Moody, and Jon Pertwee. Spike Milligan was Roald Dahl's original choice. Peter Sellers reportedly begged Dahl for the role.

All six members of Monty Python (Graham Chapman, John Cleese, Eric Idle, Terry Gilliam, Terry Jones, and Michael Palin) expressed interest in playing Wonka, but at the time they were deemed not big enough names for an international audience.

Joel Grey was the front runner for the part but director Mel Stuart decided he wasn’t physically imposing enough as the actor's height was five-foot-five. The producers learned  that Fred Astaire wanted the part, but the 72-year-old may have considered himself too old.

Actors were auditioned for the role of Willy Wonka in a suite at the Plaza Hotel in New York and by the end of the week Wilder had walked in. It was then Stuart and producer David L. Wolper realised that they could stop looking. Wolper remarked, "The role fit him tighter than one of Jacques Cousteau’s wetsuits."  Stuart was captivated by Wilder's "humor in his eyes" and said, "His inflection was perfect. He had the sardonic, demonic edge that we were looking for." Wolper tried to suppress Stuart's eagerness for the actor as he wanted to negotiate the salary. Regardless, the director ran out into the hall as Wilder was leaving and offered him the part of Wonka.

When Wilder was cast as Wonka, he accepted the role on one condition: Stuart responded, "What do you want to do that for?" Wilder answered, "From that time on, no one will know if I'm lying or telling the truth." Wilder was adamant that he would decline the role otherwise.

Jean Stapleton turned down the role of Mrs. Teevee. Jim Backus was considered for the role of Sam Beauregarde. Sammy Davis Jr. wanted to play Bill, the candy store owner, but Stuart did not like the idea because he felt that the presence of a big star in the candy store scene would break the reality; though Davis would make Bill's signature song, "The Candy Man", into a big hit.  Anthony Newley also wanted to play Bill, but Stuart also dissuaded him for the same reason.

Ten actors of short stature were the Oompa Loompas, including one woman and nine men, and were cast internationally from France, Germany, Malta, Persia (now Iran), Turkey and the UK.

The child actors who were auditioned from hundreds, Julie Dawn Cole, Denise Nickerson, Peter Ostrum and Paris Themmen all had acting experience from stage school, theatre, television or commercials.  Michael Böllner had the primary attribute of being rotund and was discovered in Germany when Stuart was location scouting. Stuart asked him to imagine being stuck in a tube and then "squeezed him like a roll of putty".

Filming 
Principal photography commenced on August 31, 1970, and ended on November 19, 1970. After location scouting in Europe, including the Guinness brewery in Ireland and a real-life chocolate factory in Spain, production designer Harper Goff decided to house the factory sets and the massive Chocolate Room at Bavaria Studios. It was also significantly cheaper than filming in the United States and the primary shooting locations in Munich, Bavaria, West Germany, made the setting conducive to Wonka's factory. Stuart also liked the ambiguity and unfamiliarity of the location.

Locations 
External shots of the factory were filmed at the gasworks of Stadtwerke München (Emmy-Noether-Straße 10); the entrance and side buildings still exist. The exterior of Charlie Bucket's house, a set constructed solely for the film, was filmed at Quellenstraße in Munich. Charlie's school was filmed at Katholisches Pfarramt St. Sylvester, Biedersteiner Straße 1 in Munich. Bill's Candy Shop was filmed at Lilienstraße, Munich. The closing sequence, in which the Wonkavator is flying above the factory, is footage of Nördlingen, Bavaria, and the elevator rising shot showing that it shoots out of the factory was from Bößeneckerstraße 4, 86720 Nördlingen, Germany, now the location of a CAP-Märkte.

Production design 
The construction of the original Inventing Room was meant to be an industrial room with steel tubes. Stuart envisioned it differently as a wacky inventor's laboratory, with Rube Goldberg type mechanisms and unusual contraptions, and wanted it redesigned to be like Wonka's personality. Goff sent his construction crew into Munich searching junkyards, bakeries, and car dealers for discarded machinery, tin funnels, and any other raw materials. This included building Wonka's three-course gum machine, which was originally a solid state device, but Stuart requested an appliance whose operations had a visual experience for the audience. Stuart also instructed Goff to have all the props, furniture and fittings, excluding the light bulbs, in Wonka's original office to be cut in half, to reflect the character's eccentricity. Stuart stated, "I couldn't face the thought of ending the journey through this fabulous factory in an ordinary-looking office."

About a third of the props in the Chocolate Room set were edible. Veruca Salt had a chocolate watermelon; Mike Teevee had gum balls from a tree; Violet Beauregarde's "three-course gum" was actually a toffee-based candy, and marzipan was freely available on set; also there were giant mushrooms filled with whipped cream; and the trees had edible leaves. The inedible items included giant gummy bears that were plastic (the ears were edible, however); the flavoured wallpaper was just wallpaper; and Wonka's flower cup was made of wax which Gene Wilder would chew on camera and spit out after each take.

In the scene at Mr. Salt's peanut factory, where thousands of Wonka bars were being unwrapped to find a Golden Ticket, the bars were actually made of wood. It was considered a cheaper solution than rewrapping thousands of bars of real chocolate.

Performances 
For the performances, Stuart used a recurring "method" tactic in a few scenes. When Wonka makes his entrance at the factory gates, nobody was aware of Wilder's approach as he limped then somersaulted; the reaction was of real surprise. The director gave explicit instructions not to allow the child actors to see the Chocolate Room set until the day of the shoot as he wanted their reactions to be genuine. The exception was Julie Dawn Cole, as Goff gave her a sneak preview. Also, the actors were not warned about the tunnel boat ride scene. Similarly, when Wilder rehearsed the Wonka office scene, with Peter Ostrum as Charlie and Jack Albertson as Grandpa Joe, it was in a much calmer tone. When filming started, he increasingly became angry. When he shouted, "So you get nothing!", it was so that the reactions would be authentic.

Other issues 
According to Paris Themmen, who played Mike Teevee, "The river was made of water with food coloring. At one point, they poured some cocoa powder into it to try to thicken it but it didn't really work. When asked [what the river was made of], Michael Böllner, who played Augustus Gloop, answers, 'It vas dirty, stinking vater. A combination of salt conditioner and some chemicals eventually removed the stink problem but it remained cold, dirty water.

Stuart had issues with the large size of the Chocolate Room set with difficulties lighting the background. Julie Dawn Cole's performance of "I Want It Now" as Veruca Salt required 36 takes and was filmed on her thirteenth birthday. Director Bob Fosse came in every afternoon to complain because the filming was overrunning towards the end and stopping him from shooting Cabaret on the same stage.

Retrospective 
In addition to the main scenes set in town and at the factory, several comic interludes were also shot. Stuart lamented in his book Pure Imagination: The Making of Willy Wonka and the Chocolate Factory, that his favorite scene was cut after poor test screenings. In the scene, which took a lot of preparation and money to film, an English explorer climbs a holy mountain to ask a guru the meaning of life. The guru requests a Wonka Bar. Finding no golden ticket, he says, "Life is a disappointment." Stuart loved the scene, but few laughed. He invited a psychologist friend to a preview, where the audience reaction was again muted. The psychologist told him, "You don't understand, Mel. For a great many people, life is a disappointment."

When interviewed for the 30th anniversary special edition in 2001, Wilder stated that he enjoyed working with most of the child actors, but said that he and the film crew had some problems with Paris Themmen. Wilder recalled, "Oh, he was a little brat!" He then addressed Themmen directly, "Now if you're watching this, you know that I love you now, but you were a troublemaker then." An example of Themmen's misbehaviour was releasing bees from a beehive on Wonka's three-course gum machine. "As life mirrored one of the morals of the movie," Stuart remembers, "one of the bees stung him."

Release

Theatrical 
Willy Wonka & the Chocolate Factory was released by Paramount Pictures on June 30, 1971. The film was not a big success, eventually earning $4 million worldwide on a budget of $3 million, and was the 24th highest-grossing film of the year in North America.

For the promotion before its release, the film received advance publicity through TV commercials offering a "Willy Wonka candy factory kit" for sending $1.00 and two seals from boxes of Quaker cereals such as King Vitaman, Life and any of the Cap'n Crunch brands.

Television 
The film made its television debut on Thanksgiving Night, November 28, 1974, on NBC.

The film was repeated the following year on November 23, 1975, on NBC. There was some controversy with the broadcast, as a football game between the Oakland Raiders and Washington Redskins went into overtime, and the first 40 minutes of the film were cut. The film placed 19th in the television ratings for the week ending November 23, beating out The Streets of San Francisco and Little House on the Prairie. The next television showing of the film was on May 2, 1976, when it placed 46th in the ratings. Some television listings indicate the showing was part of The Wonderful World of Disney time slot.

Home media 
In December 1984, the film became available on VHS and Betamax in the UK and was released in the US on VHS the same year.

In 1996, the film was released on LaserDisc as a "25th anniversary edition". Additional features included the original and reissue theatrical trailers and music minus vocals for "sing-alongs". Notes explain the letterboxed version as "presented in a "matted" widescreen format preserving the 1.85:1 aspect ratio of its original theatrical presentation. The black bars at the top and bottom of the screen are normal for this format". VHS copies were also available, but only containing the "standard"  fullscreen version. The "standard" version is an open matte print, in which the mattes used to make the image "widescreen" are removed, revealing more picture at the top and bottom that was masked off from viewers.

In 1997, the film was first released on DVD in a "25th anniversary edition" as a double sided disc containing a "widescreen" and "standard" version.

On August 28, 2001, a remastered special edition DVD was released, celebrating the film's 30th anniversary, but in "standard" fullscreen only. Because there was no "widescreen" release, fans' petitions eventually led Warner Home Video to issue a letterboxed version on November 13, 2001. Several original cast members reunited to film a "making-of" documentary titled Pure Imagination: The Story of 'Willy Wonka and the Chocolate Factory'''. The two format editions featured restored sound and better picture quality. In addition to the Pure Imagination feature, the DVD included a trailer, a gallery and audio commentary by the cast. It was also released on VHS, with only one of the special features (the Pure Imagination documentary).

In 2007, Warner Home Video released the film on HD DVD with all the bonus features from the 2001 DVD. On October 20, 2009, the film was released on Blu-ray. It included all the bonus features from the 2001 DVD and 2007 HD DVD as well as a 38-page book.

On November 1, 2011, a deluxe edition set was released for the film's 40th anniversary. The set included the film on Blu-ray and DVD, a bonus disc and a number of collectible items including a Wonka Bar tin, four scented pencils, a scented eraser, a book about the making of the film, original production notes and a "Golden Ticket" for the chance to win a trip to Los Angeles.

On June 29, 2021, a 4K Blu-ray version was released by Warner Bros. Home Entertainment to coincide with the film's 50th anniversary. This edition restored the original Paramount logo at the beginning of the film. The film would also be available to stream and download digitally in 4K high definition, including standard definition, on devices from various online video platforms.

 Reception 
 Critical response 

The film received generally positive reviews from critics. Roger Ebert gave the film four out of four stars, calling it:

Charles Champlin of the Los Angeles Times praised the film as "lively and enjoyable" and called Wilder's performance "a real star turn", but thought the songs were "instantly forgettable" and that the factory looked "a lot more literal and industrial and less empathic than it might have". Variety called the film "an okay family musical fantasy" that had "good" performances but lacked any tunes that were "especially rousing or memorable". Howard Thompson of The New York Times panned it as "tedious and stagy with little sparkle and precious little humor". Gene Siskel gave the film two stars out of four, writing, "Anticipation of what Wonka's factory is like is so well developed that its eventual appearance is a terrible letdown. Sure enough there is a chocolate river, but it looks too much like the Chicago River to be appealing. The quality of the color photography is flat. The other items in Wonka's factory—bubblegum trees and lollypop flowers—also look cheap. Nothing in the factory is appealing." Jan Dawson of The Monthly Film Bulletin wrote that after a slow start the second half of the film was "an unqualified delight—one of those rare, genuinely imaginative children's entertainments at which no adult need be embarrassed to be seen".

On review aggregator website Rotten Tomatoes, the film has a 91% approval rating and an average rating of 7.80/10 based on 53 reviews. The site's critical consensus states: "Willy Wonka & the Chocolate Factory is strange yet comforting, full of narrative detours that don't always work but express the film's uniqueness."

 Roald Dahl's reaction 
Dahl disowned the film and was "infuriated" by the plot deviations and considered the music to be "saccharine, sappy and sentimental". He was also disappointed because the film "placed too much emphasis on Willy Wonka and not enough on Charlie" and because Gene Wilder was cast as Wonka instead of Spike Milligan. In 1996, Dahl's second wife, Felicity, commented on her husband's objections toward film adaptations of his works, saying "they always want to change a book's storyline. What makes Hollywood think children want the endings changed for a film, when they accept it in a book?"

 Legacy Willy Wonka & the Chocolate Factory remained in obscurity in the subsequent years since its original release. When the distribution rights lapsed in 1977, Paramount Pictures declined to renew, considering it not viable. The rights defaulted back to the Quaker Oats Company, who were not involved in the film business, and who therefore sold them to Warner Bros. for $500,000. Wolper engineered the rights sale to Warner Bros., where he became a corporate director after selling his production company to them the previous year.

By the 1980s, the film had experienced an increase in popularity due to repeated television broadcasts and gained cult status with a new audience in home video sales. In 1996, there was a 25th anniversary theatrical re-release which grossed the film a further $21 million. In 2003, Entertainment Weekly ranked it 25th in the "Top 50 Cult Movies" of all time. The tunnel scene during the boat ride has been cited as one of the scariest in a film for children, for its surreal visuals, and was ranked No. 74 on Bravo's The 100 Scariest Movie Moments. The scene has also been interpreted as a psychedelic trip, though director Stuart denied that was his intention.

In 2014, the film was selected for preservation in the United States National Film Registry by the Library of Congress as being "culturally, historically, or aesthetically significant".

 Awards and nominations 

 Music 

The original score and songs were composed by Leslie Bricusse and Anthony Newley, and musical direction was by Walter Scharf. The soundtrack was first released by Paramount Records in 1971.

Sammy Davis Jr. recorded the song "The Candy Man" which became his only number-one hit. It would spend three weeks at the top of the Billboard Hot 100 chart starting June 10, 1972, and two weeks at the top of the easy-listening chart.

On October 8, 1996, Hip-O Records (in conjunction with MCA Records, which by then owned the Paramount catalog), released the soundtrack on CD as a "25th Anniversary Edition". In 2016, UMe and Geffen Records released a 45th Anniversary Edition LP.

Track listing

 In popular culture 
Various comedy TV series have referenced the film mainly as a parody. They include Malcolm in the Middle, My Wife and Kids, the American version of The Office, Saturday Night Live, and That '70s Show. Animated TV series have also done parodies respectively, Dexter's Laboratory ("Golden Diskette" in 1997); The Simpsons ("Trash of the Titans" in 1998); Futurama ("Fry and the Slurm Factory" in 1999); Family Guy ("Wasted Talent" in 2000); Hi Hi Puffy AmiYumi ("Taffy Trouble" in 2004); South Park ("Le Petit Tourette" in 2007); Rick and Morty ("Tales from the Citadel" in 2017); and American Dad! ("Jeff and the Dank Ass Weed Factory" in 2019).

Marilyn Manson's 1995 music video for their song "Dope Hat" was influenced by the boat ride scene. In 2001, the music video of Alien Ant Farm's song "Movies" paid homage to various Hollywood films and included a scene in which the band members were dressed as Oompa Loompas.

In the 2010s, a still from the movie became a popular Internet meme known as Condescending Wonka. In 2017, in an episode of the TV series Pawn Stars a combination of the original Everlasting Gobstopper and Wonka Bar props sold for $105,000, and an animated adaptation of the film with Tom and Jerry was released as Tom and Jerry: Willy Wonka and the Chocolate Factory''.

See also 

 List of American films of 1971
 List of films featuring miniature people

Notes

References

Sources

External links 

 
 
 
 The AFI Catalog of Feature Films..Willy Wonka and the Chocolate Factory
 Willy Wonka & the Chocolate Factory essay by Brian Scott Mednick at National Film Registry

Charlie and the Chocolate Factory
Willy Wonka
1971 films
1971 musical films
1970s musical fantasy films
American children's fantasy films
American musical fantasy films
Compositions by Leslie Bricusse
1970s English-language films
Films about children
Films about chocolate
Films based on British novels
Films based on children's books
Films based on fantasy novels
Films based on works by Roald Dahl
Films directed by Mel Stuart
Films scored by Walter Scharf
Films set in factories
Films set in Europe
Films shot in Bavaria
Films shot in Munich
Paramount Pictures films
Psychedelic films
Quaker Oats Company
Sponsored films
Films with screenplays by Roald Dahl
United States National Film Registry films
The Wolper Organization films
Films set in West Germany
Films set in Montana
Films set in England
Films produced by David L. Wolper
1970s American films